Junyung is a town in the Garzê Tibetan Autonomous Prefecture of Sichuan, China.

See also 
 List of township-level divisions of Sichuan

References 

Populated places in the Garzê Tibetan Autonomous Prefecture
Towns in Sichuan